The Security Offences (Special Measures) Act 2012 (abbreviated SOSMA) is a controversial law supposedly "to provide for special measures relating to security offences for the purpose of maintaining public order and security and for connected matters". The Act is to replace the 1960 Internal Security Act (Malaysia). The Act was introduced by Malaysian Prime Minister Najib Razak, approved in Parliament on 17 April 2012, given the Royal Assent on 18 June 2012 and Gazetted on 22 June 2012.

Structure
The Security Offences (Special Measures) Act 2012, in its current form (4 June 2015), consists of 8 Parts containing 32 sections and 2 schedules (including 1 amendment).
 Part I: Preliminary
 Part II: Special Powers for Security Offences
 Part III: Special Procedures Relating to Electronic Monitoring Device
 Part IV: Special Procedures Relating to Sensitive Information
 Part V: Trial
 Part VI: Special Procedures Relating to Protected Witness
 Part VII: Evidence
 Part VIII: Miscellaneous
 Schedules

Arrests Under the Act
Three people, including former ISA detainees Yazid Sufaat, Halimah Hussein and Mohd Hilmi Hasim, were the first ever detained under SOSMA in 2013. They were arrested for alleged incitement of terrorist acts. Following the 2013 Lahad Datu standoff, 104 Filipinos with suspected links to Jamalul Kiram III, one of the claimants to the throne of the Sultanate of Sulu, were detained under SOSMA. These included several family members of Kiram who had entered the state of Sabah using false identities.

Controversies and issues

2016 allegations and condemnations of abuse of power of the government and calls for abolition 
In 2016, SOSMA was used to arrest 15 prominent civil rights activists, including Maria Chin Abdullah, after the Bersih 5 rally, leading to widespread condemnation from various parties, including Lawyers for Liberty director Eric Paulsen, 80 civil society organisations, the Malaysian Human Rights Commission and the US State Department. Several civil rights groups also said the use of SOSMA for an organiser of a peaceful rally was abuse of power and that the Malaysian government was trying to suppress dissent by using draconian laws. In 2016, 80 prominent civil rights group collectively called for the abolition of SOSMA, calling it a "draconian" law.

2022 Dewan Rakyat parliamentary motion defeat and political instability 
On 23 March 2022, Minister of Home Affairs Hamzah Zainudin tabled the motion in Dewan Rakyat to carry on with the powers to detain suspects for up to 28 days without trial and to extend the enforcement of subsection 4(5) of SOSMA for another five years beginning from 31 July 2022. However, it suffered from a historic defeat after the dewan voted against it after it was put to a bloc vote following a heated debate among MPs by a majority of only 2 votes with 86 votes against it and 84 for it while 50 other MPs being absent. Hamzah noted that this was not the first time the government had sought to extend the powers of detention under subsection 4(5) of SOSMA. Hamzah said the preventive laws to detain suspects for such a long period is still necessary, in light of the seriousness of the crimes it intended to thwart. He also highlighted the fears of certain quarters who claimed SOSMA was being arbitrarily used to carry out political detentions, but said that the law was the best mechanism in dealing with security threats. However, many Opposition MPs were firmly against it, the reasons behind their opposition come from several statements they have made such as "provisions excluded the courts from acting as a check and balance involving detention of suspects under SOSMA, that criminal suspects are usually detained for a maximum of 14 days under the Criminal Procedure Code, which is subject to approval by the Magistrates Court", "going against SOSMA did not mean that they supported terrorism, SOSMA is a cruel law, anyone who wishes to uphold justice must think about fairness even when it comes to the accused", ''SOSMA was used as a political tool to detain future Petaling Jaya MP Maria Chin Abdullah in 2016 when she led the Bersih 2.0 movement, she was detained merely because she was championing for a free and fair democratic process". This historic event also sparked political instability within the nation with several MPs from the ruling Barisan Nasional (BN) and United Malays National Organisation (UMNO) questioning that the Opposition has nullified as well as breaking the agreements under a Memorandum of Understanding (MoU) signed on 13 September 2021 between the government and Pakatan Harapan (PH) opposition coalition to achieve political ceasefire for political stability for the sake of the nation and her people and they are no longer bound by the MoU as it stated that the Opposition can only vote for and abstain from the motion voting. Some also urged for reevaluations or termination of the MoU after the event due to the same reason and "lack of moral ground to lead the nation anymore". It was also believed that those responses of BN and UMNO MPs were due to their intentions to pressure the Prime Minister to call for an early general election for them to make a strong comeback to form a stable government with political dominance again as one of the MoU agreements stated that the Prime Minister would not call for a general election by 31 July 2022 to allow a long period of political stability after their streak of gaining numerous electoral victories in the 2020 Sabah state election, 2021 Melaka state election and 2022 Johor state election after their electoral defeat in the 2018 general election. Inspector-General of Police Acryl Sani Abdullah Sani noted that Bukit Aman would utilise existing laws including the Criminal Procedure Code (CPC) for cases under SOSMA after 31 July 2022, his statement also said that "The cases are offences under Chapter VI of the Penal Code (crimes against country), Chapter VIA of the Penal Code (terrorism offences), Chapter VIB of the Penal Code (organised crime offences), Chapter IIIA of the Anti-Human Trafficking and Anti Smuggling of Migract Act 2007 and Special Measures Combatting terrorism overseas. We remain committed to investigate to the best of our ability by using existing laws and enactment that have been enforced. After 31 July 2022, it means SOSMA will no longer include the powers to detain for up to 28 days. It involves those detained in complex security cases. The cases are offences under Chapter VI of the Penal Code (crimes against country), Chapter VIA of the Penal Code (terrorism offences), Chapter VIB of the Penal Code (organised crime offences), Chapter IIIA of the Anti-Human Trafficking and Anti Smuggling of Migract Act 2007 and Special Measures Combatting terrorism overseas". Nevertheless, political analysts, Opposition MPs and Minister in the Prime Minister's Department in charge of Parliament and Law Wan Junaidi have denied the responses by highlighting that the defeat bear no implication, it does not mean loss of confidence in the government as they are not supply bills or federal budgets, it is only due to the negligence of duties of the government parliamentary whips, the government may still retable the motion as well as it is not part of the MoU and whatever motions tabled must be firstly agreed by both sides before its tabling. A vote recount saw Speaker of the Dewan Rakyat Azhar Azizan Harun amending the voting results to 85 votes for and 86 votes against but it was still unable to overturn the results as it was still defeated by 1 vote. This revelation came to light after Jempol MP Salim Shariff was said to have mistakenly marked Besut MP Idris Jusoh as absent when votes were being tallied on the motion. Meanwhile, Lembah Pantai MP Fahmi Fadzil expressed dismay at the manually done mistakes as he said this was not the first time such a mistake happened during vote counting and hope that Azhar to improve the voting process system. Several MPs also called for it. In response, Azhar assured MPs that the CCTVs were examined to determine if Idris was actually in the House before the changes were made. He also agreed that there should be improvements to the system, remained open to proposals and expressing the possibility of implementing virtual or hybrid sittings as we have the technology to do so as well as highlighting that the proposed improvements could be brought up for discussion. After being blamed for the defeat, Fahmi has hit back at several government MPs by questioning their absences during the voting. In replies, Pekan MP Najib Razak and Pontian MP Ahmad Maslan clarified with respective reasons with the former was in court for case managements and accused Fahmi of fooling the rakyat as well as quipping PH of not fulfulling their 2018 general election manifesto by repealing SOSMA and latter was told there was no voting by several parliamentary officers. Hamzah confirmed that SOSMA vote would be retabled and expressed his disappointment and unfairness after revealing that some government MPs have deliberately left the dewan before SOSMA voting as they "did not like his face" and "neglected their responsibilities and national interests" and Opposition MPs of "playing politics". He also reiterated the importance of the motion by saying that "if any large syndicate was crippled, they would need to use the Criminal Procedure Code and bring them to face a Magistrate. What would happen? These criminals might be able to destroy evidence. This is why the 28 day detention period is necessary so that we can find the chain of evidence." Co-chair of the Bar Council Constitutional Law Committee Andrew Khoo however expressed the possibility of the retabling being delayed to 2023 due to the Standing Order 36 (3) which states that a matter that has been decided cannot be recosidered by the dewan within the same session. He also added on that "unless there is a substantive motion for rescission, it cannot be reconsidered. So they can try again next year. But, by next year, the five-year period would have lapsed", referring to
the end of the five-year-limit of the provision to detain suspects up to 28 days on 31 July 2022. The fifth or 2022 session of the 14th Dewan Rakyat comprised three meetings, the first from 28 February to 24 March, second from 18 July to 4 August and the third from 26 October to 15 December. Meanwhile, Khoo said when the Act was enacted in 2012, the Bar Council had said that the 28-day detention period should be shortened by claiming that "So, the sunset clause was written in, to review it every five years, the question is whether, if the government tried to introduce a motion to change it from 28 days to 21 or 14 or even seven days, would that be seen as being substantially different?".

References

External links

 Security Offences (Special Measures) Act 2012 

Malaysian federal legislation
Terrorism in Malaysia
2012 in Malaysian law